Zushan Mountain is a mountain in Qinglong, China. It is around two hours drive from Qinhuangdao in Hebei province.

References

Mountains of Hebei